Garima may refer to:

People

 Garima Arora (born 1986), Indian chef
 Garima Chaudhary (born 1990), Indian judoka
 Garima Panta, Nepalese actress
 Garima Poddar (born 1997), Indian chef
 Garima Sanjay, Indian author
 Garima Singh, Indian politician
 Garima Vikrant Singh, Indian actress
 Garima, a Legends of Tomorrow character

Other

 Abba Garima Monastery, Ethiopian monastery
 Garima Gospels, two ancient Ethiopic Gospel Books